Jacob Rees may refer to:

 Jacob Rees-Mogg, British politician
 Jacob Rees (architect), British architect